Proletarian Party of Peru (in Spanish: Partido Proletario del Perú), is a communist party in Peru. Its general secretary is Illipa Tuta.

Communist parties in Peru
International Coordination of Revolutionary Parties and Organizations
Political parties with year of establishment missing